More Live at the Knitting Factory is a 1993 two-CD live album by Charles Gayle. It was recorded on February 1, 15, and 22, 1993 at The Knitting Factory.

Reception

In a review for AllMusic, Ron Wynn wrote: "Tenor saxophonist Charles Gayle plays with such fury and intensity that it seems he won't make it through the performances featured on these two discs... It's impossible not to remember the 1960s and '70s free and loft jazz schools, but it's also appropriate to emphasize that Gayle doesn't sound like anyone else currently active and deserves significant attention beyond tiny jazz publications and sympathetic, but small, audiences."

The authors of The Penguin Guide to Jazz awarded the album 4 stars, and commented: "The rhythm-players... are all little known, apart from the admirable Parker... but they are wonderfully behind Gayle all the way... The... records... are exhausting manifestos... which struggle towards ecstasy or chaos, depending on one's own tolerance. A piece such as 'Sanctification'... certainly goes further in building on Ayler's legacy than even Brötzmann ever has."

Track listing

Personnel 
Vattel Cherry - bass
Michael Dorf - executive producer
Marc Edwards - drums
Charles Gayle - bass clarinet, tenor saxophone, violin
James McLean - engineer
William Parker - bass, cello, violin
Jeff Schlanger - artwork 
Michael Wimberly - drums

References 

1993 live albums
Charles Gayle live albums
Albums recorded at the Knitting Factory